Derek Smith may refer to:

 Derek Smith (basketball) (1961–1996), American NBA basketball player
 Derek Smith (footballer, born 1946), footballer for Tranmere Rovers
 Derek Smith (ice hockey, born 1954), Canadian former NHL ice hockey player
 Derek Smith (ice hockey, born 1984), Canadian ice hockey player
 Derek Smith (linebacker) (born 1975), American NFL linebacker
 Derek Smith (tight end) (born 1980), American NFL tight end
 Derek Smith (soccer) (born 1980), American soccer defender
 Derek Smith (musician) (1931–2016), British jazz pianist
 Derek Vincent Smith, known as Pretty Lights (born 1981), electronic music artist
 Derek Smith (television producer), for the BBC
 Derek V. Smith, CEO of ChoicePoint

See also
Derrick Smith (disambiguation)